Chugul is a small island located in the centre of the Andreanof Islands of the Aleutian Islands of Alaska. It is one a group of small islands that are situated between Adak Island and Atka Island. Nearby islands include Igitkin and Tagalak.

References
 

Andreanof Islands
Islands of Alaska
Islands of Unorganized Borough, Alaska